Arthur King may refer to:

Arthur Henry King (1910–2000), British poet, writer and academic
Arthur Scott King (1876–1957), American physicist and astrophysicist
Arthur King (footballer) (1887–?), Scottish footballer
Arthur King (boxer) (1927–2011), Canadian boxer of the 1940s and 1950s
 An alias of DC Comics supervillain Merlyn

See also
King Arthur (disambiguation)